Frederik Paulsen may refer to:
Frederik Paulsen Sr (1909–1997), medical doctor and founder of Ferring Pharmaceuticals
Frederik Paulsen Jr (born 1950), his son, businessman, academic, philanthropist and explorer